Strée is a village and district of the municipality of Modave, located in the province of Liège in Wallonia, Belgium.

During the Middle Ages, the village was in possession of the Knights Templar. From the 15th century, a local court of justice existed in the village. It contains a baptismal font from the same century, and a Roman funerary monument from the 3rd century, reused as a base for a crucifix. The church is surrounded by a historical cemetery and lies close to a source which was considered to have healing properties. In the village, there is also a château from  1600, rebuilt during the 18th and 19th centuies.

References

External links

Populated places in Liège Province